The J. G. Edwards House, also known as Pen-y-Brin, in Portland, Oregon, was built in 1926 in "Norman farmhouse" style.  It was designed by A.E. Doyle.  It was listed on the National Register of Historic Places in 1991.

References

Houses completed in 1926
Houses on the National Register of Historic Places in Portland, Oregon
1926 establishments in Oregon
A. E. Doyle buildings
Southwest Hills, Portland, Oregon
Portland Historic Landmarks